Harry Stephen Ackerman (November 17, 1912 – February 3, 1991) was an American television producer, credited with creating or co-creating twenty-one series, seven of which were at one time being broadcast simultaneously. Some of the sitcoms in which he was involved in production during the 1950s and 1960s are also among the most popular American shows in the early history of the “small screen”, such as Father Knows Best, Dennis the Menace, Leave It to Beaver, The Farmer's Daughter, Hazel, Bewitched, The Flying Nun, and Gidget.

Ackerman was known in the entertainment industry as the “dean of television comedy”, although he was instrumental too in developing many dramatic classics and documentaries, such as The Caine Mutiny Court-Martial, The Day Lincoln Was Shot, and The 20th Century.

Early life and education
Harry Ackerman was born in Albany, New York and attended Dartmouth College as a theater arts major.

Career
Ackerman began his career as a writer, but soon became a radio performer, appearing as the comic poet Wilbur W. Willoughby Jr. In 1938 he went to work as an advertising executive at Young & Rubicam. In 1946 he became vice president of program operations.

Ackerman began his career in television at CBS, where he started as an executive producer in New York for the network. Later he became vice president in charge of CBS programs in Hollywood, California. While at CBS he helped create, develop, oversee, and/or approve the casting of Gunsmoke, I Love Lucy, The Jack Benny Show, Burns and Allen, Amos 'n' Andy, Our Miss Brooks, and many other shows. Ackerman was CBS-TV west coast program vice president from 1948 to 1958.

He  began his own production company, Harry Ackerman Productions, where he immediately signed an exclusive deal with Paramount TV to create TV series, specials and feature films on a co-production basis, in 1973. He also went to work on network development for Hanna-Barbera Prods.  He then joined Screen Gems, which later became Columbia Pictures Television, where he worked for 15 years, from 1958 until 1973. He worked on many TV shows while there, including,  Father Knows Best, Bachelor Father (for Universal), Leave It to Beaver (for Universal), Dennis the Menace, The Donna Reed Show, Hazel, Grindl, Gidget, Bewitched, I Dream of Jeannie, The Flying Nun, The Monkees, and The Partridge Family.

In the late 1940s, before coming to Hollywood, he was involved in the beginnings of the Suspense and Westinghouse Studio One dramatic radio anthologies.

Honors
Ackerman won two Emmy Awards for his work and was the first producer ever honored by the Pacific Pioneer Broadcasters at that organization's 1974 luncheon. He was also the national president of the Academy of Television Arts & Sciences for two terms; and in recognition of his many contributions to the entertainment industry during his career, a star dedicated to him was installed in 1985 on the Hollywood Walk of Fame at 6661 Hollywood Boulevard.

Personal life and legacy
Ackerman was married twice. His second marriage, to actress Elinor Donahue, who was 25 years younger, was in 1962 at the Court of Liberty. He was the adoptive father of her son from her first marriage (to Richard Smith), and he and Donahue had three sons together.

Ackerman in 1991 died of “pulmonary failure” at age 78 at St. Joseph Medical Center in Burbank, California. He is buried in the Garden of Heritage at Forest Lawn Hollywood Hills.

Three years later, as a memorial to her husband and to serve as an important resource for research on the history of American television, Elinor Donahue donated The Harry Ackerman Collection of personal papers to the Rauner Library at Dartmouth College. Ackerman was an alumnus of Dartmouth, having graduated from the college in 1935.

References

External links

The Papers of Harry Ackerman at Dartmouth College Library

 

1912 births
1991 deaths
American television producers
Burials at Forest Lawn Memorial Park (Hollywood Hills)
Dartmouth College alumni missing graduation year
20th-century American businesspeople
Bewitched